MIN-117 (known formerly as WF-516) is an investigational antidepressant which is under development by Minerva Neurosciences for the clinical treatment of major depressive disorder (MDD). It is described as a 5-HT1A and 5-HT2A receptor antagonist and inhibitor of serotonin and dopamine reuptake, and is also reported to possess affinity for the α1A- and α1B-adrenergic receptors. As of May 2015, MIN-117 is in phase II clinical trials for MDD. In December 2019, Minerva announced that MIN-117 was no longer in clinical development for MDD after disappointing results in a phase IIb trial.

See also 
 List of investigational antidepressants

References

External links 
 MIN-117 - Minerva Neurosciences
 Investor Presentation March 2015 - Minerva Neurosciences
 MIN-117 - AdisInsight

4-Phenylpiperidines
5-HT1A antagonists
5-HT2A antagonists
Antidepressants
Benzofuran ethers at the benzene ring
Serotonin–dopamine reuptake inhibitors